Turner County is the name of two counties in the United States:

 Turner County, Georgia
 Turner County, South Dakota